Euglossa sovietica is a Euglossine bee species found in the western Brazilian Amazon. It is believed to be part of the Euglossa purpurea group.

References

Further reading
Parra-H, A., and G. Nates-Parra. "The ecological basis for biogeographic classification: an example in orchid bees (Apidae: Euglossini)." Neotropical entomology 41.6 (2012): 442–449.
Silveira, Fernando A., and Alessandra S. Alvarenga. "O acervo de abelhas da Coleção entomológica das coleções Taxonômicas da UFMG." MG BIOTA 4 (2012): 5-24.

External links

sovietica
Hymenoptera of South America
Hymenoptera of Brazil
Fauna of the Amazon
Insects described in 2007
Orchid pollinators